Maastricht Science Programme (abbreviated as MSP) is an English language liberal arts and sciences programme, founded in 2010. The programme is part of Maastricht University and offers an honours programme. It is located in Maastricht in the Netherlands.

History

The Maastricht Science Programme was founded in 2010 and received its first students in the 2011–12 academic year. The MSP is the second liberal arts and sciences programme in Maastricht alongside its sister programme, University College Maastricht (UCM). Like UCM, the Maastricht Science Programme is part of the Faculty of Science and Engineering of Maastricht University.

Academics

Courses at the Maastricht Science Programme are taught fully in English. After graduating from the MSP, students obtain a Bachelor of Science degree (BSc).

Classes are small and structured using Problem-Based Learning (PBL). Students also participate in undergraduate research.

Curriculum structure

At the Maastricht Science Programme (MSP), students construct their curriculum by choosing courses in the fields of:
 Astronomy
 Biology
 Biomedical Engineering
 Biomaterials
 Chemistry
 Entrepreneurship
 Mathematics
 Neuroscience
 Physics

Courses are structured in a 1000 to 3000-level structure, indicating an increasing level of complexity and requiring previous knowledge. Per semester, students choose 4 courses (each 5 ECTS). In addition to courses, students are required to choose two skill trainings (each 2.5 ECTS). Finally, students are required to take one project (5 ECTS) per semester. A BSc degree at the MSP comprises a total of 180 ECTS.

Students enrol in a maximum of 30 ECTS per semester or 60 ECTS per academic year. The final semester of the MSP consists of the Bachelor Thesis Research module (BTR), which is worth 30 ECTS.

References

External links
 Maastricht Science Programme homepage
 Aperture homepage

Education in Maastricht
Maastricht University
Liberal arts colleges at universities in the Netherlands
Educational institutions established in 2010
2010 establishments in the Netherlands